There are 563 scheduled monuments in the county of Gloucestershire, England. These protected sites date from the Neolithic period and include barrows, moated sites, ruined abbeys, castles, Roman villas and tithe barns.
In the United Kingdom, the scheduling of monuments was first initiated to insure the preservation of "nationally important" archaeological sites or historic buildings. The protection given to scheduled monuments is given under the Ancient Monuments and Archaeological Areas Act 1979

Notable scheduled monuments in Gloucestershire

See also
Grade I listed buildings in Gloucestershire 
List of scheduled monuments in the United Kingdom

References

Scheduled monuments in Gloucestershire